A Coloring Storybook and Long-Playing Record is the first and only EP by American pop punk band Cinematic Sunrise, a side project of Chiodos' Bradley Bell and Craig Owens. The pair's pop rock project is strictly about having a good time and making music that is innocent and fun to play. "Basically, the whole idea - everything about Cinematic Sunrise - is just happy and fun. And there's nothing more fun than coloring," explains vocalist Craig Owens about the decision to include a coloring book with their aptly titled debut EP A Coloring Storybook and Long Playing Record. It was originally released with four colored pencils intended for use in a book that includes drawings of animals with caricatures of the band members hidden somewhere in the environment.

Craig Owens said in an interview that he requested crayons, not colored pencils. He was supposedly disappointed by Equal Vision's mishap.

On October 14, 2008, Equal Vision Records re-released A Coloring Storybook and Long-Playing Record. The re-release includes two bonus tracks titled, "If Lilly Isn't Back by Sunset" and "Crossing Our Fingers for Summer".

Track listing 
Source: Amazon

Personnel 
Source: Official Equal Vision site
 Craig Owens – lead vocals
 Bryan Beeler – guitars
 Marcus VanKirk – bass guitar
 Bradley Bell – keyboards, piano, synthesizers
 Dave Shapiro – drums
Album Version of The Wordless

References 

2008 debut EPs
Cinematic Sunrise albums
Coloring books